Salarpur is a census town in Varanasi tehsil of Varanasi district in the Indian state of Uttar Pradesh. The census town &  village falls under the Salarpur gram panchayat. Salarpur Census town & village is about 8 kilometres North-East of Varanasi railway station, 329 kilometres South-East of Lucknow and 4 kilometres South-East of Sarnath.

Demography
Salarpur  has 1656 families with a total population of 10126. Sex ratio of the census town & village is 893 and child sex ratio is 949. Uttar Pradesh state average for both ratios is 912 and 902 respectively .

Transportation
Salarpur is connected by air (Lal Bahadur Shastri Airport), by train (Varanasi City railway station) and by road. Nearest operational airports is Lal Bahadur Shastri Airport and nearest operational railway station is Varanasi City railway station (25 and 8 kilometres respectively from Salarpur).

See also
 Varanasi Cantt.
 Varanasi (Lok Sabha constituency)

Notes

  All demographic data is based on 2011 Census of India.

References 

Census towns in Varanasi district
Cities and towns in Varanasi district